Sai Dheena is an Indian actor who has appeared in Tamil language films since 2004. He played the antagonist in  Attu (2017), Thimiru Pudichavan (2018) and Vaandu (2019).

Career 
Sai Dheena worked as a signboard artist, before moving on to a job in the railways, before moving on to appear as a henchman in films, followed by playing supporting roles. He made his debut in Kamal Haasan's Virumaandi (2004) as a jail warden, after being spotted by the actor where he went to work as an extra henchman in the film. He has since starred in films including Shankar's Enthiran (2010), Atlee's Theri (2016), and  Vetrimaaran's Vada Chennai (2018). He portrayed the antagonist in Thimiru Pudichavan (2018). In a review of the film Sagaa (2019) by the New Indian Express, the critic noted that he "plays the role with meticulous intensity".

Personal life 
In 2017, Dheena received attention from the media for financially helping out actor Viruchagakanth (aka Pallu Babu) of Kaadhal (2004) fame. Viruchagakanth had been begging at temples in Chennai. Dheena, along with actors Abi Saravanan and Mohan, was able to help the actor.

Philanthropy
During the coronavirus outbreak, Dheena assisted 250 families with food, including rice, wheat, and sambar.

Filmography

Tamil films

Telugu films

References

External links 

Indian male film actors
Male actors in Tamil cinema
Living people
21st-century Indian male actors
Year of birth missing (living people)
Male actors in Telugu cinema